Miss America 1968, the 41st Miss America pageant, was held at the Boardwalk Hall in Atlantic City, New Jersey on September 9, 1967 on NBC Network.

Results

Order of announcements

Top 10

Top 5

Awards

Preliminary awards

Other awards

Contestants

References

External links
 Miss America official website

1968
1967 in the United States
1968 beauty pageants
1967 in New Jersey
September 1967 events in the United States
Events in Atlantic City, New Jersey